The Gulf of Khambhat, historically known as the Gulf of Cambay, is a bay on the Arabian Sea coast of India, bordering the state of Gujarat just north of Mumbai and Diu Island. Major rivers draining Gujarat are the Narmada, Tapti, Mahi and the Sabarmati, that form estuaries in the gulf.

It divides the Kathiawar Peninsula from the south-eastern part of Gujarat.

There are plans to construct a  dam, Kalpasar Project, across the gulf.

Wildlife
To the west of the Gulf, Asiatic lions inhabit the Gir Forest National Park and its surroundings, the region of Kathiawar or Saurashtra. To the east of the Gulf, the Dangs' Forest and Shoolpaneshwar Wildlife Sanctuary, where Gujarat meets Maharashtra and Madhya Pradesh, used to host Bengal tigers.

See also
City of Khambhat
 Coral reefs in India
Dumas Beach
Marine archaeology in the Gulf of Cambay
Marine National Park, Gulf of Kutch

References

 
Landforms of Gujarat
Khambhat
Bodies of water of the Arabian Sea
Khambhat